The Washa Mikael Rock-Hewn Church (Amharic: ዋሻ ሚካኤል [wä schä mi kä el] literally "The Cave of Michael")  is a rock-hewn semi-monolithic church located in the Yeka District of Addis Ababa, the capital city of Ethiopia. Historians and the Ethiopian Orthodox Church date it back as far as the 4th century AD pointing to its resemblance to Aksumite era churches in other regions of Ethiopia and to the Sabaean artifacts found at the site of the church. They further explain that structures in and around the church show that the area was once used as a training ground for the horsemen of the Aksumite armies of King Ezana, arguing that the area was one of the territory held by the vast Kingdom of Aksum. It is a popular tourist destination.

History 
Washa Mikael church was constructed in the Shoan architectural style with some influences from the Aksumite style. Similar to the some of the churches of Lalibela, Washa Mikael is a rock-hewn semi-monolithic church.

In the 19th century, Emperor Menelik II rediscovered the structure after it was initially abandoned during the Abyssinian-Adel war. He had the Tabot of St. Michael moved from inside the church to a church he had built lower down the mountain called Yeka Mikael. He subsequently made attempts at restoring and preserving the structures of the church.

The church suffered damages during the heavy bombing campaigns of the Italians during the second Italo-Ethiopian War.

From above the church has a "U" shape also known as the letter "ሀ" in the Ethiopian Alphabet. This shape was meant to signify the Ge'ez phrase starting with the same letter, "ሀልዎቱለ ኣብ እምከድሜ ዐለም" (Halwotule ab emkdme alem) which means “Before anything existed, God was here”. The original church stood 7 meters tall and had 7 windows which represented the 7 heavens, 7 days and 7 angels.

Gallery

References 

Churches in Addis Ababa
Ethiopian Orthodox Tewahedo church buildings
4th-century churches
Monolithic churches in Ethiopia